Jesuits have founded and/or managed a number of institutions, the first of which was Georgetown Preparatory School, established in 1789. The second oldest is St. Louis University High School, which was founded in 1818. Jesuit secondary schools in the U.S. include (listed by state):

Alaska
 Monroe Catholic High School (Fairbanks)

Arizona
Brophy College Preparatory (Phoenix)

California
Bellarmine College Preparatory (San Jose)
Cristo Rey San José Jesuit High School (San Jose)
Cristo Rey High School, (Sacramento) (along with 2 other congregations)
Loyola High School (Los Angeles)
Jesuit High School (Sacramento)
St. Ignatius College Preparatory (San Francisco)
Verbum Dei High School, (Los Angeles) (Archdiocesan, administered by the Jesuits) 
Xavier College Preparatory, (Palm Desert) (Jesuit-endorsed, as in Ignatian tradition)

Colorado
Arrupe Jesuit High School (Denver)
Regis Jesuit High School (Aurora)

Connecticut
 Fairfield College Preparatory School (Fairfield)

District of Columbia
 Gonzaga College High School (Washington, D.C.)

Florida
 Belen Jesuit Preparatory School (Miami) 
 Jesuit High School (Tampa)

Georgia 
 Cristo Rey Atlanta Jesuit High School

Illinois

Loyola Academy (Wilmette)
Cristo Rey Jesuit High School (Chicago)
Christ the King Jesuit College Prep High School (Chicago)
St. Ignatius College Prep (Chicago)

Indiana
 Brebeuf Jesuit Preparatory School (Indianapolis)

Louisiana
Jesuit High School (New Orleans)

Maine
Cheverus High School (Portland)

Maryland

 Cristo Rey Jesuit High School  (Baltimore)
 Georgetown Preparatory School (North Bethesda)
 Loyola Blakefield (Towson)

Massachusetts
Boston College High School (Boston)

Michigan
Loyola High School (Detroit)
University of Detroit Jesuit High School and Academy (Detroit)

Minnesota

 Cristo Rey Jesuit High School  (Minneapolis)

Missouri
De Smet Jesuit High School (Creve Coeur)
Rockhurst High School (Kansas City)
Saint Louis University High School (St. Louis)

Montana
 Loyola Sacred Heart High School (Missoula)

Nebraska
 Creighton Preparatory School (Omaha)

New Jersey
 St. Peter's Preparatory School (Jersey City)

New York

Canisius High School (Buffalo)
Cristo Rey New York High School, (New York City) (with 2 other congregations)
Fordham Preparatory School (New York City)
Loyola School (New York City)
McQuaid Jesuit High School (Rochester)
Regis High School (New York City)
Xavier High School (New York City)

Ohio
Saint Ignatius High School (Cleveland) (Cleveland)
St. John's Jesuit High School and Academy (Toledo)
St. Martin de Porres High School (Cleveland) (Cleveland)
St. Xavier High School (Cincinnati)
Walsh Jesuit High School (Cuyahoga Falls)

Oregon

Jesuit High School (Portland)

Pennsylvania
Saint Joseph's Preparatory School (Philadelphia)
Scranton Preparatory School (Scranton)

Puerto Rico
Colegio San Ignacio de Loyola (San Juan)

South Dakota
Red Cloud High School (Pine Ridge)

Texas
Jesuit College Preparatory School (Dallas)
Strake Jesuit College Preparatory (Houston)
Cristo Rey Jesuit College Preparatory of Houston (Houston)

Washington

 Bellarmine Preparatory School (Tacoma)
 Gonzaga Preparatory School (Spokane)
 Seattle Preparatory School

Wisconsin
Marquette University High School (Milwaukee)
Campion High School (Prairie du Chien, Wisconsin) (closed in 1975; alumni association remains active.)
Cristo Rey Jesuit High School Milwaukee

See also
 Association of Jesuit Colleges and Universities
 List of Jesuit educational institutions
 University-preparatory school
 List of former Jesuit secondary schools in the United States
 List of Jesuit sites
 Jesuits in the United States